The papal conclave of March–April 1605 was convened on the death of Pope Clement VIII and ended with the election of Alessandro Ottaviano de' Medici as Pope Leo XI on 1 April 1605. It was the first of two papal conclaves in 1605, with Leo dying on 27 April 1605, twenty-six days after he was elected, and the conclave to elect his successor being held in May. The conclave saw conflict regarding whether Cesare Baronius should be elected pope, and Philip III of Spain, the Spanish king, excluded both Baronius and the eventually successful candidate, Medici. Philip's exclusion of Medici was announced by Cardinal Ávila after his election to the papacy, and the other cardinals did not view it as valid since Medici had already been elected pope.

Nicholas II had reserved the right to elect the pope to the cardinal bishops, priests, and deacons of Rome in 1059. The cardinal bishops were the highest rank, being the bishops of the ancient suburbicarian dioceses, the priests ranked next, who served as the titular head of historically important churches in Rome, and last ranked the cardinal deacons, who were nominally assigned one of the ancient diaconia where traditionally deacons had administered the temporal property of the Church of Rome. Cardinals were required to have been ordained at least to the rank of their order within the College of Cardinals, but could also be ordained to a higher order as well.

In 1586, Pope Sixtus V mandated that the maximum number of cardinals would be seventy. Of these, the College of Cardinals had sixty-nine total members at the time of Clement VIII's death, but only sixty were present for the first conclave of 1605 when it opened, and sixty-one total electors were present for the election of Leo XI. The electors present had been created by six different popes: Pius IV, Gregory XIII, Sixtus V, Gregory XIV, Innocent IX, and Clement VIII. Of these, Clement's creations were the most numerous, having created thirty-eight of the cardinal electors. Innocent IX had created one of the conclave's electors, Gregory XIV had created five, Sixtus V had created eleven, Gregory XIII had created four, and Pius IV had created one.

Pietro Aldobrandini, the cardinal-nephew of Clement VIII, was the elector who controlled the largest number of votes with twenty-two of Clement's thirty-eight creations following his instructions. Alessandro Peretti di Montalto, the nephew of Sixtus V, controlled eight votes. Thirteen of the cardinal electors were loyal to the Spanish monarchy, and these electors and the faction loyal to Montalto were aligned. In addition to these groups, eight of the electors formed a faction that were loyal to the French crown.

List of cardinal electors

Notes

Citations

References

1605 in the Papal States
17th-century elections in Europe
1605 in politics
17th-century Catholicism
1605 03